Rick Niemeyer is a Republican member of the Indiana State Senate, elected in 2014. Representing the 6th district since November 14, 2014, Niemeyer also previously served one term in Indiana House of Representatives for district 11, from 2012 to 2014.

Niemeyer studied at Indiana State University. He held office on the Lake County, Indiana council before being elected to the state legislature. He is a member of the Environmental Affairs, Local Government, Homeland Security & Transportation, and Veterans Affairs & the Military committees.

He is the owner and operator of Lowell Livestock Auction, and a managing broker of Niemeyer Realty. He is also an auctioneer and owner of Niemeyer Auction Services.

After the retirement of 30-year incumbent Sue Landske, Niemeyer opted to run for the Republican nomination for her old seat. After winning the Republican nomination, he went on to win on the November 4 general election.

Sources
Indiana House bio
Vote Smart bio of Niemeyer
http://ballotpedia.org/Rick_Niemeyer

References

Indiana State University alumni
Republican Party members of the Indiana House of Representatives
Living people
People from Lake County, Indiana
Year of birth missing (living people)
21st-century American politicians